Tangowahine is a community on the northern Kaipara Harbour in Northland, New Zealand. The Tangowahine Stream flows from the Tutamoe Range east and then south to join the Wairoa River at Tangowahine. State Highway 14 passes through Tangowahine. Dargaville is 12 km to the south west, and Tangiteroria is 15 km north east.

History
A bridge was built over the Tangowahine River in 1893-95, to allow a road from Dargaville to Tangiteroria to be completed.

Tangowahine was a mill town for the kahikatea and kauri timber trade. Robert Gibbon's mill was built around 1900 and included electric lighting. Steamers loaded timber at the town's two wharves. The S.S. Matarere ran a passenger service. The population was 402 in about 1910. The mill was rebuilt after a fire in 1916, and closed in 1931. Gum-diggers also operated in the area in the early 20th century.

From January 1931, Tangowahine was the terminus for the railway line. In 1940, the line was extended to Dargaville.

Demographics
The SA1 area is part of the larger Maungaru statistical area.

The SA1 statistical area had a population of 147 at the 2018 New Zealand census, an increase of 18 people (14.0%) since the 2013 census, and an increase of 39 people (36.1%) since the 2006 census. There were 54 households, comprising 72 males and 75 females, giving a sex ratio of 0.96 males per female. The median age was 41.1 years (compared with 37.4 years nationally), with 42 people (28.6%) aged under 15 years, 18 (12.2%) aged 15 to 29, 63 (42.9%) aged 30 to 64, and 27 (18.4%) aged 65 or older.

Ethnicities were 89.8% European/Pākehā, 28.6% Māori, 6.1% Pacific peoples, 4.1% Asian, and 2.0% other ethnicities. People may identify with more than one ethnicity.

Although some people chose not to answer the census's question about religious affiliation, 53.1% had no religion, 34.7% were Christian and 2.0% were Buddhist.

Of those at least 15 years old, 9 (8.6%) people had a bachelor's or higher degree, and 33 (31.4%) people had no formal qualifications. The median income was $27,000, compared with $31,800 nationally. 6 people (5.7%) earned over $70,000 compared to 17.2% nationally. The employment status of those at least 15 was that 45 (42.9%) people were employed full-time, 12 (11.4%) were part-time, and 9 (8.6%) were unemployed.

Education
Tangowahine School is a coeducational full primary (years 1-8) school with a roll of  students as of

Notes

Kaipara District
Populated places in the Northland Region